Liolaemus parvus is a species of lizard in the family Iguanidae.  It is endemic to Argentina.

References

parvus
Lizards of South America
Reptiles of Argentina
Endemic fauna of Argentina
Reptiles described in 2008
Taxa named by Andrés Sebastián Quinteros
Taxa named by Cristian Simón Abdala